Courland is one of the historical and cultural regions of Latvia.

Courland may also refer to:

 Political entities
 Bishopric of Courland, an ecclesiastical state in the Livonian Confederation 1254-1562
 Duchy of Courland and Semigallia, 1561–1795 (including a list of dukes)
 Duchess of Courland, a list
 Courland Governorate, a Baltic governorate of the Russian Empire 1795–1915
 Provisional Land Council of Courland, 1917
 Duchy of Courland and Semigallia (1918), a short-lived client state of the German Empire

 Other uses
 Courland (Saeima constituency), constituency of the Saeima, the national legislature of Latvia
 Courland Peninsula, the north-western part of Courland
 Courland Pocket, the part of the Courland Peninsula in which Axis forces were confined by the Red Army July 1944 - May 1945
 Army Group Courland, Axis forces in the Courland Pocket January - May 1945

See also 
 Kurland (disambiguation) (the German name)
 Kurzeme (disambiguation) (the Latvian name)